Kathy Brier (born March 10, 1975) is an American actress and singer, known for her work on ABC soap opera One Life to Live and the Broadway production of Hairspray.

Early life
Brier grew up in Staten Island, New York, where she attended Moore Catholic High School before studying theatre and business at Wagner College, qualifying for a Bachelor of Science in arts administration.

Career
Brier played the role of Marcie Walsh McBain on ABC soap opera One Life to Live from October 18, 2002, until June 17, 2009 and returned briefly in November 2009. She also returned to the role briefly in 2011, in late October and early November. In 2004 her performance earned her a nomination for a Daytime Emmy Award for "Outstanding Supporting Actress in a Drama Series."

From 2003 to 2004, Brier played the starring role of Tracy Turnblad in the Broadway production of Hairspray, having previously been the standby for Tony Award winner Marissa Jaret Winokur for six months.

Brier began acting in the theatre, with regional credits that include Fanny Brice in Funny Girl, Libby Tucker in I Oughta Be in Pictures, Joy in Cinderella, and Rizzo In Grease. Her Off-Broadway credits include Ron Taylor and Mayor Maggie in Bat Boy The Musical at Union Square Theatre, The Prince and the Pauper at The Lamb's Theatre, O'Casey Knock at The John Houseman Theatre, Tango Ballad at The Actors Studio and A Broadway Diva Christmas at the Julia Miles Theatre.

In 2010, Brier appeared on the HBO series Boardwalk Empire, episode 1.9 Belle Femme, and portrayed singer/actress, Sophie Tucker, a well-known vaudeville performer. She also sings some of the original music of the series.

Personal life
Brier was married in 2010 and she and her husband had a son in 2011.

Filmography
2019 The Boys

References

External links

1975 births
Living people
American soap opera actresses
Actresses from New York (state)
People from Staten Island
Wagner College alumni
21st-century American actresses